Hugues de Payens or Payns (9 February 1070 – 24 May 1136) was the co-founder and first Grand Master of the Knights Templar. In association with Bernard of Clairvaux, he created the Latin Rule, the code of behavior for the Order.

Name 
The majority of the primary sources of information for his life are presented in Latin or the medieval French language. In French his name usually appears as Hugues de Payens or Payns. His earliest certain appearance in documents is under the part-Latin, part-French name Hugo de Peans (1120–1125; details below). Later Latin sources call him Hugo de Paganis. In English works he often appears as Hugh de Payns, in Italian sometimes as Ugo de' Pagani'.

 Origin and early life 

There is no known early biography of Hugues de Payens in existence, nor do later writers cite such a biography. None of the sources on his later career give details of his early life. Information is therefore scanty and uncertain; embellishments depend partly on documents that may not refer to the same individual, partly on histories written decades or even centuries after his death.

The earliest source that details a geographical origin for the later Grand Master is the Old French translation of William of Tyre's History of Events Beyond the Sea. The Latin text calls him simply Hugo de Paganis, but the French translation, dated to c. 1200, describes him as Hues de Paiens delez Troies ("Hugh of Payens near Troyes"), a reference to the village of Payns, about 10 km from Troyes, in Champagne (eastern France).

In early documents of that region Hugo de Pedano, Montiniaci dominus is mentioned as a witness to a donation by Count Hugh of Champagne in a document of 1085–90, indicating that the man was at least sixteen by this date—a legal adult and thus able to bear witness to legal documents—and so born no later than 1070. The same name appears on a number of other charters up to 1113 also relating to Count Hugh of Champagne, suggesting that Hugo de Pedano or Hugo dominus de Peanz was a member of the Count's court. By the year 1113 he was married to Elizabeth de Chappes, who bore him at least one child, Thibaud, later abbot of the Abbaye de la Colombe at Sens. The documents span Hugues' lifetime and the disposition of his property after his death.

The one belated statement that the founder of the Knights Templars came from "Payns near Troyes" has some circumstantial confirmation. Bernard of Clairvaux, who favoured the Order and helped to compose its Latin Rule, also had the support of Hugh of Champagne. The Latin Rule of the Order was confirmed at the Council of Troyes in 1129. A Templar commandery was eventually built at Payns. Some scholars have however looked for Hugues' origins elsewhere. There was an early claim that he came from the Vivarais (the district of Viviers in the modern département of Ardèche). Hugues has also been identified with Hug de Pinós, third son of Galceran I, lord of Pinós in Catalonia; however, Galceran married only in 1090, far too late a date for him to be the father of the founder of the Knights Templars.

There is also a claim that Hugues de Payens or Ugo de' Pagani came from Nocera de' Pagani in Campania, southern Italy. Reference to Nocera as his birthplace is found at least as early as Baedeker's Southern Italy (1869) and is also found in the Old Catholic Encyclopedia. Two more recent writers say that the theory is supported by a letter that Hugues wrote from Palestine in 1103, in which he talked of writing to "my father in Nocera" to tell him of the death of his cousin Alessandro.Mario Moiraghi, L'Italiano che fondò i Templari. Hugo de Paganis cavaliere di Campania (Edizioni Ancora, 2005. ) See interview with Moiraghi

 The foundation of the Order 

Hugh, Count of Champagne made a pilgrimage to the Holy Land in 1104–07 and visited Jerusalem for a second time in 1114–16. It is probable that he was accompanied by Hugues de Payens, who remained there after the Count returned to France as there is a charter with "Hugonis de Peans" in the witness list from Jerusalem in 1120 and again in 1123. In 1125 his name appears again as a witness to a donation, this time accompanied by the title "magister militum Templi" ("Master of the Knights of the Temple"). He most likely obtained approval for the Order from King Baldwin II of Jerusalem and Warmund, Patriarch of Jerusalem at the Council of Nablus in 1120. 

One early chronicler, Simon de St. Bertin, implies that the Knights Templar originated earlier, before the death of Godfrey of Bouillon in 1100: "While he [Godfrey] was reigning magnificently, some had decided not to return to the shadows of the world after suffering such dangers for God's sake. On the advice of the princes of God's army they vowed themselves to God's Temple under this rule: they would renounce the world, give up personal goods, free themselves to pursue purity, and lead a communal life wearing a poor habit, only using arms to defend the land against the attacks of the insurgent pagans when necessity demanded."

Later chroniclers write that Hugues de Payens approached King Baldwin II of Jerusalem (whose reign began in 1118) with eight knights, two of whom were brothers and all of whom were his relatives by either blood or marriage, in order to form the Order of the Knights Templar. The other knights were Godfrey de Saint-Omer, Payen de Montdidier, Archambaud de St. Amand, André de Montbard, Geoffrey Bison, and two men recorded only by the names of Rossal and Gondamer. Baldwin approved the foundation of the Order and entrusted the Temple of Jerusalem to its care.

Count Hugh of Champagne himself joined the Knights Templar on his third visit to the Holy Land in 1125.

As Grand Master, Hugues de Payens led the Order for almost twenty years until his death, helping to establish the Order's foundations as an important and influential military and financial institution. On his visit to England and Scotland in 1128, he raised men and money for the Order, and also founded their first House in London and another near Edinburgh at Balantrodoch, now known as Temple, Midlothian. The Latin Rule laying down the way of life of the Order, attributed to Hugues de Payens and Bernard of Clairvaux, was confirmed in 1129 at the Council of Troyes over which Pope Honorius II presided.

Hugues de Payens died in 1136. The circumstances and date of his death are not recorded in any chronicle, though the Templars commemorated him every year on 24 May, and it's presumed he died of old age. The 16th century historian Marco Antonio Guarini claimed that Hugues was buried in the Church of San Giacomo at Ferrara. He was succeeded as Grand Master by Robert de Craon.

In popular culture
It has recently been claimed that the wife of Hugues de Payens was Catherine St. Clair within the context of the alternative history of Rosslyn.The claim that Hugues de Payens married Catherine St. Clair was made in Les Dossiers Secrets d'Henri Lobineau (1967), "Tableau Généalogique de Gisors, Guitry, Mareuil et Saint-Clair par Henri Lobineau" in Pierre Jarnac, Les Mystères de Rennes-le-Château, Mélanges Sulfureux (CERT, 1995).

Hugues is the main protagonist of the Jack Whyte novel Knights of the Black and White.

Hughes is mentioned on the TV series Knightfall'' in season 2, chapter 5.

Notes

External links 

The Crusades and the Knights Templar
Helen Nicholson, translator, Contemporary reactions to the foundation of the Templars
Hugues de Payns Museum  Payns, France

1070s births
1136 deaths
Year of birth uncertain
People from Troyes
Grand Masters of the Knights Templar
Medieval French nobility
Medieval Knights Templar members
12th-century French people